Luigi Piacentini (born 1930) is an Italian field hockey player. He competed in the men's tournament at the 1952 Summer Olympics.

References

External links
 

1930 births
Living people
Italian male field hockey players
Olympic field hockey players of Italy
Field hockey players at the 1952 Summer Olympics
Sportspeople from Pisa